Gaeil Colmcille CLG is a Gaelic Athletic Association club located in the town of Kells, County Meath, Ireland.  

The club currently plays at senior level in the Meath Senior Football Championship and play their home games at Grangegodden and Pairc Colmcille.

History

The club was founded in 1964 and had almost immediate success, reaching the Meath Senior Football final in 1964 but lost by 2 points to Kilbride GFC 0-08 to 0-06. In 1966 the club won the Meath Senior Football Championship for the first time beating Kilbride 0-08 to 0-06 after the teams couldn't be separated after two previous games. They won their second title in 1968 beating Walterstown in the final 3-17 to 1-04. They won their third and most recent Senior Football Championship in 1991, when they defeated Walterstown again in the final by 1-12 to 1-06, Terry Ferguson captaining the side that day, with Eugene McGillick picking up the Man of the Match award. The club has won the Meath Intermediate Hurling Championship four times, most recently in 2008. On 13 October 2013, Gaeil Colmcille won the Meath Intermediate Football Championship beating Clann Na nGael in the final 0-18 to 0-05, paving the way for the club's return to senior ranks in 2014.

Keegan Cup Winning Captains

1966 - Phil Fay

1968 - Harry Campbell (RIP)

1991 - Terry Ferguson

Club officers 2021

Chairperson: Olivia Ferguson, Vice-Chairperson: David Courtney, Secretary: Mary Farrell, Assistant Secretary: Deirdre Williams, Treasurer: Hugh Early, Assistant Treasurer: Ann Smith, Registrar: Carol Thornton, P.R.O: Alan Tormey

Main sponsors

The club's main sponsor is The Headfort arms hotel. The club's Adult Hurlers are sponsored by Annie Maes Bar, while the clubs underage section is sponsored by Kelly Brothers Roadlines Ltd. The club's Adult Ladies team is sponsored by Gerard O'Rorke Chartered Accountants.

Club colours

The club wears white, red and green. The club released a new jersey for the 2019 season.

2019 Championship

Senior

The Club was drawn in Group A of the 2019 Meath Senior Football Championship along with Dunshaughlin, St. Patrick's, Skryne, Navan O'Mahonys and Senechalstown. The first round fixture v Dunshaughlin took place in Skryne on 4 April 2019 at 8pm. While their second round fixture v St. Patrick's took place on Easter Sunday, 21 April at 12pm in Rathkenny.

Group stage

 First Round (Group)
 Gaeil Colmcille 1-11 Dunshaughlin 0-13

 Second Round (Group) 
 Gaeil Colmcille 2-14 St. Patrick's 1-10

 Third Round (Group)
 Gaeil Colmcille 0-11 Navan O'Mahony's 1-11

 Fourth Round (Group)
 Gaeil Colmcille 3-18 Skryne 0-05

 Fifth Round (Group)
 Gaeil Colmcille 8-09 Senechalstown 2-11

Quarter-final

Gaeil Colmcille 1-12 Donaghmore/Ashbourne 0-10. 
Pairc Tailteann, Saturday 28 September, 3.45pm

Semi-final

Gaeil Colmcille 1-10 Ratoath 2-14
Pairc Tailteann, Sunday 13 October, 4.00pm

Junior

The club's Junior A Team was drawn in Group C of the 2019 Meath Junior Football Championship along with Na Fianna, Navan O'Mahonys, Senechalstown, Skryne, Dunshaughlin, Summerhill and Wolfe Tones. The first round fixture v Na Fianna took place in Trim on 13 April 2019 at 6pm. While their second round fixture v Wolfe Tones took place on Easter Saturday, 20 April at 7pm in Nobber.

Group stage

 First Round
 Gaeil Colmcille 3-11 Na Fianna 0-06

 Second Round
 Gaeil Colmcille 3-09 Wolfe Tones 2-11

 Third Round
 Gaeil Colmcille 1-10 Senechalstown 0-12

 Fourth Round
 Gaeil Colmcille 2-12 Dunshaughlin 2-09

 Sixth Round
 Gaeil Colmcille 1-18 Summerhill 2-15

 Fifth Round
 Gaeil Colmcille 4-15 Navan O'Mahony's 1-11

 Seventh Round
 Gaeil Colmcille 0-15 Skryne 1-13

Quarter-final

Gaeil Colmcille 0-10 Dunsany 2-11
Kilmainham, Sunday 29 September, 5.00pm

2020 Championship

Senior

The Club was drawn in Group D of the 2020 Meath Senior Football Championship along with St. Colmcille's, St. Peter's, Dunboyne and Dunshaughlin. The first round fixture v St. Colmcille's took place in Drumconrath on 1st August 2020 at 6pm. Due to the COVID-19 restrictions there was a capacity limit of 200 persons with only 55 supporters from each team allowed in. The second round fixture v St. Peter's, Dunboyne will take place on Sunday, 16 August at 6pm in Pairc Tailteann. The third round fixture v Dunshaughlin will take place in Walterstown on Sunday 30 August at 3pm.

Group stage

 First Round (Group)
 Gaeil Colmcille 1-17 St. Colmcille's 1-12

 Second Round (Group)
 Gaeil Colmcille 3-08 St. Peter's, Dunboyne 0-13

 Third Round (Group)
 Gaeil Colmcille 2-15 Dunshaughlin 1-15

Semi-final

Gaeil Colmcille defeated Na Fianna 2-15 to 0-13 in the Semi-Final played in Pairc Tailteann. They would now face Ratoath in the final after they defeated Summerhill.

Final

Ratoath 1-14 Gaeil Colmcille 1-13 

Gaeil Colmcille met Ratoath on 4th of October in Pairc Tailteann. A Gaeil Colmcille penalty scored by Brian Hanlon put Gaeil Colmcille 3 points up in injury time but a point and a last minute goal gave Ratoath a one point victory.

Premier

2020 saw Meath GAA change the gradings and all second, third and fourth teams were placed in the newly formed Premier Championship. Our Premier team was drawn in Division 1B along with Senechalstown, Skryne and Summerhill. The first round fixture v Seneschalstown took place in Seneschalstown on 2 August 2020 at 12pm. While their second round fixture v Skryne will place on Saturday, 15 August at 4pm in Grangegodden. The third round fixture v Summerhill will take place on Sunday 30th August at 12pm in Grangegodden.

Group stage

 First Round (Group)
 Seneschalstown 4-09 Gaeil Colmcille 1-12

 Second Round (Group)
 Gaeil Colmcille 0-11 Skryne 3-13

 Third Round (Group)
 Gaeil Colmcille 1-12 Summerhill 1-07

As a result of Gaeil Colmcille's last round win over Summerhill they secured their position in Division 1 of the Premier Championship for 2021.

Honours
Meath Senior Football Championship: 3
1966, 1968, 1991
 Meath Intermediate Football Championship: 2
 1986, 2013
 Meath Junior Football Championship: 2
 1966, 1992
 Meath Junior B Football Championship: 2
 1979, 1974, 2017
 Meath Junior C Football Championship: 1 
 1990
Meath Intermediate Hurling Championship: 4
 1974, 1988, 1996, 2008
 Meath Junior 2 Hurling Championship: 1
 2011
Meath Feis Cup: 2
2015 2018
 Meath A Football League Div 1: 3
 1991, 1994, 2019
Meath 'A' Football League Div 2: 2
 1986, 2015
 Meath A Football League Div 3: 1
 2004
 Meath Under 21 Football Championship: 3
 1989, 1990, 1996
 Meath Under 16 Football Championship: 3
 1989, 1992, 2019
 Meath Under 14 Football Championship: 3
 1987, 1990, 2018
 Meath Under 12 Football Championship: 2
 1985, 1988

References
https://www.facebook.com/gaeilcolmcille.gaa
https://twitter.com/GaeilColmcille
https://web.archive.org/web/20100723140322/http://meath.gaa.ie/fixtures-results.htm
http://gaeilcolmcille.ie

Gaelic games clubs in County Meath